Louis Christiaan Moolman (21 January 1951 - 10 February 2006) was a Northern Transvaal and Springboks Rugby Union player. He was born in Pretoria, South Africa and went to school at Hoërskool Verwoerdburg. He played in the lock position.

Playing career
Moolman played his first test for the Boks on 27 August 1977 against a World Invitation Side at Loftus Versfeld, Pretoria. He played his last test on 31 May 1986 against the New Zealand Cavaliers at Ellis Park Stadium, Johannesburg at the age of 35. In total he played in 24 tests.

Moolman was a solid lock forward and was an impressive sight with his bulk and thick beard (1.95m and 111 kg) driving upfield with the ball in hand. He represented Northern Transvaal in 171 matches over a period of 13 seasons (1974–86). Only Naas Botha and Burger Geldenhuys represented the province on more occasions. He appeared in the Currie Cup final 9 times, of which 5 were won, and one drawn.

Test history

Death
Moolman died after a short illness after suffering a stroke.

Accolades
In 2000 he was inducted into the University of Pretoria Sport Hall of fame.

See also
List of South Africa national rugby union players – Springbok no. 498

References

1951 births
2006 deaths
South African rugby union players
South Africa international rugby union players
Rugby union locks
University of Pretoria alumni
Rugby union players from Pretoria
Blue Bulls players